Kerry Walter Sibraa  (born 12 October 1937) is a former Australian Senator who represented the Labor Party for the state of New South Wales. He was educated at North Sydney Boys High School. 

He served as a Senator for from 13 December 1975 to 30 June 1978, and then again from 9 August 1978 until 1 February 1994, and was President of the Senate from 17 February 1987 to 31 January 1994. During the 1970s Sibraa provided inside-information about Labor to the United States of America in what an historian has called "a discreet relationship".

After leaving Parliament, Sibraa was the Australian High Commissioner to Zimbabwe from March 1994 until February 1998. On 26 January 1997 Sibraa was made an Officer of the Order of Australia "for service to the Parliament of Australia, to international relations and to the community." On 1 January 2001 he was awarded the Centenary Medal.

Sibraa was a special counsel for the public relations and government relations firm Wells Haslem.

References

 

1937 births
Living people
People educated at North Sydney Boys High School
Australian Labor Party members of the Parliament of Australia
Presidents of the Australian Senate
Members of the Australian Senate
Members of the Australian Senate for New South Wales
High Commissioners of Australia to Zimbabwe
High Commissioners of Australia to Malawi
High Commissioners of Australia to Zambia
Ambassadors of Australia to Angola
High Commissioners of Australia to Botswana
High Commissioners of Australia to Namibia
Ambassadors of Australia to the Democratic Republic of the Congo
Officers of the Order of Australia
20th-century Australian politicians